Golovo is a village in the municipality of Čajetina, western Serbia. At the 2011 census, the village had a population of 169 people.

References

Populated places in Zlatibor District